Frederik Coning (7 December 1594 – 7 June 1636), was a Dutch Golden Age member of the Haarlem schutterij.

Biography
He was born in Haarlem as the son of Hendrick Hendricksz and Neeltje Soeteman, and the brother of Cornelis and Hendrick. He married Jacquemijne de Wolff of Bruges, the widow of his brother-in-law Anthoni Regoot. He became a lieutenant of the St. George militia in Haarlem from 1624-1627 and captain from 1630-1633. He was portrayed by Frans Hals in The Banquet of the Officers of the St George Militia Company in 1627.

On 7 March 1635 he was buried in Haarlem.

References

Frederik Coning in De Haarlemse Schuttersstukken, by Jhr. Mr. C.C. van Valkenburg, pp. 50–51, Haerlem : jaarboek 1961, ISSN 0927-0728, on the website of the North Holland Archives

1594 births
1636 deaths
Frans Hals
People from Haarlem